The National Supercomputer Center in Guangzhou houses Tianhe-2, which is currently the seventh fastest supercomputer in the world, with a measured 33.86 petaflop/s (quadrillions of calculations per second).  Tianhe-2 is operated by the National University of Defence Technology, and owned by the Chinese government.

See also

 Supercomputing in China
 National Supercomputing Center of Tianjin
 National Supercomputing Center (Shenzhen)
 Shanghai Supercomputer Center

References

External links
National Supercomputing Center in Guangzhou

Guangzhou
Computer science institutes in China
Science and technology in China
Supercomputer sites
Supercomputing in China
2014 establishments in China